"A Thing Called Love" is a song written and originally recorded by Jerry Reed in 1968. This song has been recorded by many artists, including Jimmy Dean, Elvis Presley, Glen Campbell and Dave Dudley. In 1971, the song was recorded by Johnny Cash and it became a No. 1 country hit in Canada. The record was Cash's biggest hit in Europe, charting in Ireland, the United Kingdom, and the Netherlands.

Chart performance

Jimmy Dean

Johnny Cash

References 

1968 songs
1968 singles
1972 singles
Jerry Reed songs
Jimmy Dean songs
Johnny Cash songs
Irish Singles Chart number-one singles
Songs written by Jerry Reed
Columbia Records singles
RCA Victor singles
Anti-war songs